State Route 180 (SR 180) is a  long east–west state highway in the southern portion of the U.S. state of Ohio.

Route description
Along its path, SR 180 travels through northeastern Ross County, the extreme southeastern corner of Pickaway County and the northwestern part of Hocking County.  No portion of this highway is included within the National Highway System (NHS).  The NHS is a network of routes determined to be most important for the economy, mobility and defense of the nation.

History
The SR 180 designation was applied in 1927.  Prior to this time, the stretch of highway that SR 180 currently occupies through Ross, Pickaway and Hocking Counties was designated as SR 27.  With the designation of the US 27 in that year, SR 27 was replaced by SR 180.  The only change related to SR 180 since its inception has been the highway that it meets at its eastern terminus, which at the time was the predecessor to US 33, SR 31.

Construction began in October 2019 on SR 180 western terminus with SR 159. The project redesigns the intersection with a roundabout. Originally, an extension of SR 207 was supposed to meet up, but due to the discovery of a wetland in the environmental study, SR 207 would not intersect with SR 180. Construction was completed the following October.

Major intersections

References

180
180
180
180